Snuggery Power Station is a power station near Tantanoola in the Limestone Coast region of South Australia. It was built in 1978. It is now owned by Synergen Power, a subsidiary of Engie Energy International.

The power station has a generating capacity of 63 MW, consisting of three diesel-fueled open cycle gas turbines. It is used as a peaking power plant.

References

Diesel power stations in South Australia
Buildings and structures completed in 1978